better known by his ring name Kamikaze (sometimes stylized in capital letters as KAMIKAZE) is a Japanese professional wrestler currently working as a freelancer and is best known for his tenure with the Japanese promotions Pro Wrestling Zero1 and Big Japan Pro Wrestling.

Professional wrestling career

Big Japan Pro Wrestling (1998–2002)
He competed in various of the promotion's signature events such as the Saikyo Tag League, making his first appearance in the first-ever edition of the event from 1999, where he teamed up with Shunme Matsuzaki and scored a total of two points after going against the teams of Tomoaki Honma and Ryuji Yamakawa, Shadow WX and The Winger, and Mike Samples and Jun Kasai. At the 2000 edition, he teamed up with Abdullah Kobayashi and placed themselves in the block A where they failed to score any points after competing against the teams of Abdullah the Butcher and Shadow WX, Men's Teioh and Daisuke Sekimoto, and Daikokubo Benkei and Shunme Matsuzaki. At the 2001 edition. he teamed up with Hideki Hosaka and scored a total of five points after going against the teams of Fantastik and Ryuji Ito, Men's Teioh and Daisuke Sekimoto, Abdullah Kobayashi and Daikokubo Benkei, and Masato Tanaka and Shunme Matsuzaki.

Maruyama also competed in a variety of different tournaments hosted by BJW. Between March 18 and 20, 2001, he took part in a tournament to determine the first ever BJW Heavyweight Champion which he won after defeating Mad Man Pondo in the quarterfinals, Wifebeater in the semifinals, and John Zandig in the finals. A week after, he competed in a tournament for the vacant BJW Deathmatch Heavyweight Championship, where he defeated Jun Kasai in the first rounds but fell short to Justice Pain in the quarterfinals. At the 2001 edition of the Six-Man Maximum Tag League, he teamed up with Hideki Hosaka and Shunme Matsuzaki and won the whole tournament by topping the only block with a totl of five point after competing against the teams of Men's Club (Men's Teioh, Daisuke Sekimoto and Ryuji Ito), Jun Kasai, Mad Man Pondo and Ruckus, and Skinheads (Daikokubo Benkei, Abdullah Kobayashi and Naoki Numazawa).

Pro Wrestling Zero1 (2002–2018)
Maruyama made his debut in Pro Wrestling Zero1 on the second night of the ZERO-ONE Creation 2002 from June 29, where he teamed up with Yoshiaki Fujiwara to defeat Rapid Fire and Steve Corino in a tag team match. During his sixteen-year tenure with the company, he has been a former World Heavyweight Champion, a two-time United National Heavyweight Champion, and a three-time NWA Intercontinental Tag Team Champion with two different partners. However, he has also competed for other titles, such as the vacant All Asia Tag Team Championship at ZERO-ONE Rebel Z 2003 on December 25, where he teamed up with Jun Kasai to unsuccessfully challenge Mr. Gannosuke and Tetsuhiro Kuroda for them.

He is known for competing in various of the promotion's signature events such as the Fire Festival in which he made his first appearance at the 2008 edition where he placed himself in the block A where he scored a total of two points after competing against Togi Makabe, Masaaki Mochizuki, Shinjiro Otani and Kohei Sato. At the 2012 edition, he placed himself in the block B where he scored a total of two points after going against Masato Tanaka, Daisuke Sekimoto, Kohei Sato and Muhammad Yone. At the 2015 edition, he placed himself in the block A where he scored a total of six poinsta after going against Kohei Sato, Masato Tanaka, Yusaku Obata, Fujita Hayato and Masakado. At the 2016 edition of the events, he scored a total of fifteen points in the only active block after going against Shinjiro Otani, Yusaku Obata, Masato Tanaka, Ryota Hama, James Raideen, Kohei Sato, Shogun Okamoto, Hayato Fujita and Buffa.

As for the Furinkazan, he made his first appearance at the 2009 and first-ever editinon of the tournament, where he teamed up with long-time tag team partner Kohei Sato, placing themselves in the block B, where they scored a total of five points after competing against the teams of Masato Tanaka and Masaaki Mochizuki, Shiro Koshinaka and Hajime Ohara, Rikiya Fudo and Shito Ueda, and Tsutomu Oosugi and Hercules Senga. He scored his best result at the 2010 edition in which he alongside Sato came out victorious by toppling the block A with eight points after outmatching the teams of Akebono and Shinjiro Otani, Phil Davis and Sean Davis, Hikaru Sato and Munenori Sawa, and Kintaro Kanemura and Takuya Sugawara. At the 2011 edition, he teamed up with Sato again in the block B and scored five points against Fujita Hayato and Masato Tanaka, Akebono and Daichi Hashimoto, Schwarz and Weiss, and Mineo Fujita and Shito Ueda. At the 2013 edition, he and Sato defeated Tank Nagai and Yoshikazu Yokoyama in the first rounds, obtained a walkover victory in the second ones, but fell short to Daisuke Sekimoto and Yuji Okabayashi in the third rounds. At the 2014 edition, Maruyama teamed up with Daemon Ueda to defeat Atsushi Onita and Masashi Aoyagi in the first rounds and then fell short to Masato Tanaka and Takashi Sugiura in the second ones. At the 2016 edition, he teamed again with Kohei Sato and fell short to Kai and Yusaku Obata in the first rounds.

New Japan Pro Wrestling (1994, 2005–2008)
Maruyama made sporadic appearances in New Japan Pro Wrestling. He began in the NJPW Super Grade Tag League IV, a tournament which took place between October 15, 1994, in which he teamed up with Masayoshi Motegi and failed to score any points after competing against the teams of El Samurai and 2 Cold Scorpio, Black Tiger and The Great Sasuke, Super Delfin and Taka Michinoku, Shinjiro Otani and Wild Pegasus, Gran Hamada and Norio Honaga, and Dean Malenko and Tokimitsu Ishizawa. At NJPW Toukon Souzou New Chapter on October 8, 2005, where he teamed up with Kohei Sato, Ryouji Sai and Shinjiro Otani in a losing effort against Hiroyoshi Tenzan, Naofumi Yamamoto, Takashi Iizuka and Yutaka Yoshie as a result of an eight-man tag team match. At Toukon Shidou Chapter 1 on January 4, 2006, he teamed up with Daisuke Sekimoto, Kohei Sato, Riki Choshu, Takashi Uwano and Yoshihito Sasaki to defeat Hirooki Goto, Hiroshi Nagao, Osamu Nishimura, Takashi Iizuka, Tatsumi Fujinami and Toru Yano in a Twelve-man tag team match. At NJPW Lock Up on February 24, 2008, he teamed up with Yoshihito Sasaki in a losing effort against Great Bash Heel (Togi Makabe and Toru Yano).

Championships and accomplishments
Apache Pro-Wrestling Army
WEW World Tag Team Championship (1 time) – with Kohei Sato
Big Japan Pro Wrestling
BJW Heavyweight Championship (1 time, inaugural)
BJW Tag Team Championship (2 times) – with Shunme Matsuzaki (1) and Abdullah Kobayashi (1)
Six Man Maximum Tag League (1998, 2001)
Pro Wrestling Illustrated
Ranked No. 428 of the top 500 singles wrestlers in the PWI 500 in 2010
Pro Wrestling Zero1
World Heavyweight Championship (1 time)
United National Heavyweight Championship (2 times)
NWA Intercontinental Tag Team Championship (3 times) – with Kohei Sato (2) and Shinjiro Otani (1)
Furinkazan (2010) – with Kohei Sato

References

1971 births
Living people
Japanese male professional wrestlers
People from Tochigi Prefecture
Sportspeople from Tochigi Prefecture
21st-century professional wrestlers